The 2014 Vancouver International Film Festival, the 33rd event in the history of the Vancouver International Film Festival, was held from September 25 to October 10, 2014.

The festival's opening gala film was Jean-Marc Vallée's Wild, and its closing gala was Damien Chazelle's Whiplash.

Awards
Award winners were announced on October 10.

Films

Special Presentations
Above Us All — Eugene Jensen
Amazonia 3D — Thierry Ragobert
Cathedrals of Culture — Michael Madsen, Michael Glawogger, Margreth Olin, Karim Aïnouz, Robert Redford, Wim Wenders
Clouds of Sils Maria — Olivier Assayas
Foxcatcher — Bennett Miller
Goodbye to Language — Jean-Luc Godard
The Golden Era — Ann Hui
Living Is Easy with Eyes Closed — David Trueba
Maps to the Stars — David Cronenberg
Men, Women & Children — Jason Reitman
The Riot Club — Lone Scherfig
The Tale of the Princess Kaguya — Isao Takahata
The Vancouver Asahi — Yuya Ishii
Welcome to Me — Shira Piven
Wild Tales — Damián Szifron
Winter Sleep — Nuri Bilge Ceylan

Canadian Images
1987 — Ricardo Trogi
All the Time in the World — Suzanne Crocker
Black Fly — Jason Bourque
The Boy from Geita — Vic Sarin
Bye Bye Blues — Anne Wheeler
Corbo — Mathieu Denis
The Creation of Meaning — Simone Rapisarda Casanova
A Different Drummer: Celebrating Eccentrics — John Zaritsky
Dirty Singles — Alex Pugsley
Elephant Song — Charles Binamé
Everything Will Be — Julia Kwan
An Eye for Beauty (La Règne de la beauté) — Denys Arcand
Fall — Terrance Odette
Just Eat It: A Food Waste Story — Grant Baldwin
Marinoni: The Fire in the Frame — Tony Girardin
Martin's Pink Pickle — René Brar
Miraculum — Daniel Grou
Mommy — Xavier Dolan
Monsoon — Sturla Gunnarsson
October Gale — Ruba Nadda
Preggoland — Jacob Tierney
The Price We Pay — Harold Crooks
The Pristine Coast — Scott Renyard
Sitting on the Edge of Marlene — Ana Valine
Songs She Wrote About People She Knows — Kris Elgstrand
Turbulence — Soran Mardookhi
Two 4 One — Maureen Bradley
The Valley Below — Kyle Thomas
Violent — Andrew Huculiak
What Are We Doing Here? (Qu’est-ce qu’on fait ici ?) — Julie Hivon
You're Sleeping Nicole (Tu dors Nicole) — Stéphane Lafleur

Cinema of Our Time
52 Tuesdays — Sophie Hyde
Asteroid — Marcelo Tobar
August Winds (Ventos de Agosto) — Gabriel Mascaro
Beautiful Youth (Hermosa juventud) — Jaime Rosales
Behavior (Conducta) — Ernesto Daranas
Beloved Sisters (Die geliebten Schwestern) — Dominik Graf
Boy and the World (O Menino e o Mundo) — Alê Abreu
Boychoir — François Girard
Buzzard — Joel Potrykus
Casa Grande — Fellipe Barbosa
Charlie's Country — Rolf de Heer
Class Enemy (Razredni sovražnik) — Rok Biček
Clownwise (Klauni) — Viktor Tauš
Come to My Voice (Were Denge Min) — Hüseyin Karabey
Corn Island (Simindis kundzuli) — Giorgi Ovashvili
Decent People (Gente de bien) — Franco Lolli
Difret — Zeresenay Berhane Mehari
Field of Dogs (Psie Pole) — Lech Majewski
Fish & Cat — Shahram Mokri
The Fool (Durak) — Yuri Bykov
Force Majeure (Turist) — Ruben Östlund
Free Fall (Szabadesés) — György Pálfi
The Gambler (Losejas) — Ignas Jonynas
God Help the Girl — Stuart Murdoch
Güeros — Alonso Ruizpalacios
Heaven Knows What — Ben and Joshua Safdie
Highway — Imtiaz Ali
History of Fear (Historia del Miedo) — Benjamín Naishtat
Hope and Wire — Gaylene Preston
Horse Money (Cavalo Dinheiro) — Pedro Costa
Human Capital (Il capitale umano) — Paolo Virzì
In Order of Disappearance (Kraftidioten) — Hans Petter Moland
Jauja — Lisandro Alonso
The Kindergarten Teacher — Nadav Lapid
Lakshmi — Nagesh Kukunoor
Leviathan — Andrey Zvyagintsev
The Liberator (Libertador) — Alberto Arvelo
Listen Up Philip — Alex Ross Perry
Manos sucias — Josef Wladyka
Mr. Turner — Mike Leigh
N – The Madness of Reason — Peter Krüger
Navajazo — Ricardo Silva
Noble — Stephen Bradley
Of Horses and Men (Hross í oss) — Benedikt Erlingsson
The Owners — Adilkhan Yerzhanov
Papusza — Joanna Kos-Krauze, Krzysztof Krauze
Parasite (Huba) — Wilhelm Sasnal, Anka Sasnal
Paris of the North (París Norðursins) — Hafsteinn Gunnar Sigurðsson
Phoenix — Christian Petzold
The Princess of France (La princesa de Francia) — Matías Piñeiro
Queen and Country — John Boorman
Red Knot — Scott Cohen
Rocks in My Pockets (Akmeņi manās kabatās) — Signe Baumane
The Rooftops — Merzak Allouache
Run — Philippe Lacôte
Something Must Break (Nånting måste gå sönder) — Ester Martin Bergsmark
Sorrow and Joy (Sorg og glæde) — Nils Malmros
Stations of the Cross (Kreuzweg) — Dietrich Brüggemann
Still Life — Uberto Pasolini
Tales — Rakhshān Banietemad
To Kill a Man (Matar a un hombre) — Alejandro Fernández Almendras
Two Days, One Night (Deux jours, une nuit) — Jean-Pierre and Luc Dardenne
The Two Faces of January — Hossein Amini
Two Shots Fired (Dos disparos) — Martín Rejtman
Two Step — Alex R. Johnson
Una Vida: A Fable of Music and the Mind — Richie Adams
Welcome to New York — Abel Ferrara
White Bird in a Blizzard — Gregg Araki
The Womb (El Vientre) — Daniel Rodríguez Risco
The Wonders (Le meraviglie) — Alice Rohrwacher
Zero Motivation — Talya Lavie

Spotlight on France
24 Days (24 jours, la vérité sur l'affaire Ilan Halimi) — Alexandre Arcady
Handmade with Love from France (Le Temps suspendu) — Julie Georgia Bernard
In the Name of My Daughter (L'Homme qu'on aimait trop) — André Téchiné
The Kidnapping of Michel Houellebecq (L'enlèvement de Michel Houellebecq) — Guillaume Nicloux
Life of Riley (Aimer, boire et chanter) — Alain Resnais
Li'l Quinquin (P'tit Quinquin) — Bruno Dumont
Love at First Fight (Les Combattants) — Thomas Cailley
Miss and the Doctors (Tirez la langue, mademoiselle) — Axelle Ropert
La Sapienza — Eugène Green

Documentaries
Becoming Bulletproof — Michael Barnett
Challat of Tunis — Kaouther Ben Hania
Concerning Violence — Göran Olsson
The Creator of the Jungle (Sobre la marxa) — Jordi Morató
A Dangerous Game — Anthony Baxter
The Decent One (Der Anständige) — Vanessa Lapa
Faith Connections — Pan Nalin
Flore (Flore, route de la Mer) — Jean-Albert Lièvre
Food Chains — Sanjay Rawal
How I Came to Hate Math (Comment j'ai détesté les maths) — Olivier Peyon
Iranian — Mehran Tamadon
Jalanan — Daniel Ziv
Maidan — Sergei Loznitsa
Marmato — Mark Grieco
Meat and Milk (De chair et de lait) — Bernard Bloch
My Name Is Salt — Farida Pacha
Nelson Mandela, the Myth and Me — Khalo Matabane
New Boobs — Sacha Polak
Red Army — Gabe Polsky
Sacro GRA — Gianfranco Rosi
Waiting for August — Teodora Ana Mihai
Walking Under Water — Eliza Kubarska
We Come as Friends — Hubert Sauper
The Wild Years (Els anys salvatges) — Ventura Durall
The Wound and the Gift — Linda Hoaglund
Yakona — Anlo Sepulveda, Paul Collins

Dragons & Tigers
2030 (Nước) — Nguyễn Võ Nghiêm Minh
Black Coal, Thin Ice — Diao Yinan
Blind Massage — Lou Ye
Coming Home — Zhang Yimou
A Corner of Heaven — Zhang Miaoyan
Disconcerto — Tatsushi Omori
The Dossier — Rikun Zhu
Exit — Chienn Hsiang
Flowing Stories — Jessey Tsang Tsui-Shan
The Furthest End Awaits — Chiang Hsiu-chiung
Hill of Freedom — Hong Sang-soo
The Horses of Fukushima — Yojyu Matsubayashi
The Iron Ministry — J.P. Sniadecki
Journey to the West — Tsai Ming-liang
Jungle School (Sokola Rimba) — Riri Riza
Man on High Heels — Jang Jin
Men Who Save the World — Liew Seng Tat
The Midnight After — Fruit Chan
Non Fiction Diary — Jung Yoon-suk
Ow — Yohei Suzuki
Rekorder — Mikhail Red
Revivre — Im Kwon-taek
Sea Fog (Haemoo) — Shim Sung-bo
Sharing — Makoto Shinozaki
The Sun, the Moon and the Hurricane — Andri Cung
Uncertain Relationships Society — Heiward Mak
The Uncle Victory — Zhang Meng

Altered States
Alleluia — Fabrice Du Welz
Bloody Knuckles — Matt O'Mahony
The Editor — Adam Brooks and Matthew Kennedy
A Girl Walks Home Alone at Night — Ana Lily Amirpour
Housebound — Gerard Johnstone
The Incident (El Incidente) — Isaac Ezban
The Infinite Man — Hugh Sullivan
It Follows — David Robert Mitchell
The Well — Thomas Hammock

Arts & Letters
Advanced Style — Lina Plioplyte
Art and Craft — Sam Cullman, Jennifer Grausman
Ballet 422 — Jody Lee Lipes
Before the Last Curtain Falls — Thomas Wallner
Cartoonists - Foot Soldiers of Democracy — Stéphanie Valloatto
Dominguinhos — Mariana Aydar, Joaquim Castro, Eduardo Nazarian
Finding Fela — Alex Gibney
Glen Campbell: I'll Be Me — James Keach
The Great Museum — Johannes Holzhausen
Ilya and Emilia Kabakov: Enter Here — Amei Wallach
In Search of Chopin — Phil Grabsky
Looking for Light: Jane Bown — Luke Dodd, Michael Whyte
Mercedes Sosa: The Voice of Latin America — Rodrigo H. Vila
Miss Hill: Making Dance Matter — Greg Vander Veer
Nas: Time Is Illmatic — One9
National Gallery — Frederick Wiseman
The Other One: The Long Strange Trip of Bob Weir — Mike Fleiss
The Past Is a Grotesque Animal — Jason Miller
The Possibilities Are Endless — James Hall, Edward Lovelace
Pulp: A Film About Life, Death and Supermarkets — Florian Habicht
Que Caramba es la Vida — Doris Dörrie
Regarding Susan Sontag — Nancy Kates
The Salt of the Earth — Wim Wenders, Juliano Ribeiro Salgado
Trespassing Bergman — Jane Magnusson, Hynek Pallas

Canadian Short Films
3rd Page from the Sun — Theodore Ushev
40 Candles — Sophie Jarvis
The Acting Teacher — Aaron Craven
Back Streets — Cameron MacGowan
Bedbugs: A Musical Love Story — Matthew Kowalchuk
Bengal Light — Olivier Godin
Bison — Kevan Funk
The Blue Marble — Co Hoedeman
Broken Face — Alain Fournier
Broken Palace — Ross Munro
Burnt Grass — Ray Wong
Chamber Drama — Jeffrey Zablotny
The Chaperone — Fraser Munden
The Cut (La Coupe) — Geneviève Dulude-De Celles
Cutaway — Kazik Radwanski
Day 40 — Sol Friedman
Dead Hearts — Stephen W. Martin
Dorsal — Aidan Shipley
Eclissi — Tygh Runyan
Fallow — Breanna Cheek
Godhead — Connor Gaston
Hard Card — Lucas Hrubizna
The Hearing — Russell Ratt-Brascoupe
Hole — Martin Edralin
Howard and Jean — Heather Young
Just Living — Bryan Demore and Neil Champagne
Jutra — Marie-Josée Saint-Pierre
Kreb — Tim Tracey
Land of the Sun — Melissa Flagg
Life's a Bitch (Toutes des connes) — François Jaros
Lifers — Joel Salaysay
Light — Yassmina Karajah
Little Brother (Petit frère) — Rémi St-Michel
Luk'Luk'I: Mother — Wayne Wapeemukwa
Mynarski Death Plummet — Matthew Rankin
Never Stop Cycling — Colin Lepper
Not Indian Enough — Alex Zahara
Pour Retourner — Scooter Corkle
The Rehearsal — Carl-Antonyn Dufault
Righteous — Cory Bowles
Ship — Jeff Petry
Sleeping Giant — Andrew Cividino
Stray — Ashley McKenzie
Tigerbomb! — Andrew Struthers
A Tomb with a View — Ryan J. Noth
The Weatherman and the Shadowboxer — Randall Okita
What Doesn't Kill You — Rob Grant
Withering Heights — Liz Van Allen Cairns

International Short Films
130909: A Portrait of Marina Abramovic — Matthu Placek
6-Minute Mom — Chris Shimojima
Absolution — Dean Butler
All the Pain in the World — Tommaso Pitta
Alphonso — Erenik Beqiri
Anal Juice — Sawako Kabuki
Anmado/Clean Me — Kang Sangwoo
The Black Butterflies — Antoine Blanchet
Budding, Swelling — Ryoya Usuha
Business as Usual: The Prophet's on Board (Business As Usual – Der Prophet fliegt mit) — Lenn Kudrjawizki
Cowboy Ben — Scott Rawsthorne, Jon Shaikh
David Hockey: In the Now — Lucy Walker
De Riria Subasutaimu — Shinsaku Hidaka
Deaf and Wind — Hwang Kyuil
Emo: The Musical — Neil Triffett
Flower Bud — Saki Nakano
Grounded — Alexis Michalik
Gyro — Madoka
Hollygrove: The True Life Story of Monserrat — Carlos Hurtado
I'm Not a Hairdresser — Lee Hyungsuk
In the Blind — Davis Hall
Inside Voices — Ryland Walker Knight
Katie — Nathan Gotsch
Keep Dancing — Greg Vander Veer
Leidi — Simon Mesa Soto
Letter to Annabelle — Dom Marano
The Light Harvester — Jason Howden
The Lion's Mouth Opens — Lucy Walker
A Long Beside — Paul Wong
Magnificent View — Nam Keunhak
Nest of Stone — Kim Noce
Newspaper — Yoshinao Satoh
Niagara — Chie Hayakawa
No One But Lydia — Rob Richert
Out of Reach (Rain Night) — Pablo Diartinez
Outlier — Martin Wallner
Penance — Jeff Wolfe
Phone Box — Alan Powell
Rain on Film — Tim Woodall, Phil Drinkwater
Rappa — Yuki Nakajima
Rattlefly — Min Ding
Revelations — Annakate Chappell
Los Rosales — Daniel Ferreira
Sequence — Carles Torrens
Skunk — Annie Silverstein
The Small Garden — Shunsuke Saito
Snow Hut — Yoriko Mizushiri
Soliton — Isamu Hirabayashi
Sophie — Alex Lombard
The Stomach — Ben Steiner
They Came at Night — Andrew Ellis, Alex Mallis
The Tide Keeper — Alyx Duncan
Waiter — Ryoji Yamada
White, Heat, Lights — Takashi Nakajima

References

Vancouver
Vancouver
Vancouver
Vancouver International Film Festival